Zhongyuan is a town in Qionghai, Hainan, China.

History 
Zhongyuan was established as a town in 1986.

Administrative divisions 
Zhongyuan administers 22 administrative villages.

Demographics 
As of 2018, Zhongyuan has a hukou population of 31,323. Zhongyuan had a population of 29,889 people as of 2002.

Transportation 

See also
List of township-level divisions of Hainan

References

Township-level divisions of Hainan